Durandiella is a genus of fungi in the family Dermateaceae. The genus contains 10 species.

The genus name of Durandiella is in honour of Elias Judah Durand (1870–1922), who was an American mycologist and botanist.

The genus was circumscribed by Fred Jay Seaver in Mycologia Vol.24 (Issue 2) on page 261 in 1932.

Species 
Durandiella alni
Durandiella andromedae
Durandiella callunae
Durandiella fraxini
Durandiella gallica
Durandiella lenticellicola
Durandiella nemopanthi
Durandiella pseudotsugae
Durandiella rosae
Durandiella rugosa
Durandiella salicis
Durandiella seriata
Durandiella sibirica
Durandiella tsugae
Durandiella viburnicola

See also 

 List of Dermateaceae genera

References

External links 

 Durandiella at Index Fungorum

Dermateaceae genera